Edmund James Cambridge Jr. (September 18, 1920 – August 18, 2001) was an American actor and director who was a founding member of the Negro Ensemble Company (NEC) and the Kilpatrick-Cambridge Theater Arts School.

Biography 
Cambridge was born on September 18, 1920 in Harlem, New York.

At age 15, Cambridge began his professional career at Swan's Paradise in Harlem as a chorus boy.  This assignment ended when his mother discovered that he was sneaking out of bed to do the job.
Edmund was the President of the Original Cambridge Players, who took a Los Angeles premiere of The Amen Corner to Broadway at the Ethel Barrymore Theater in April 1965.  Founding member Juanita Moore was friends with Marlon Brando and James Baldwin. It was Moore who asked Brando to lend funds ($75) for Baldwin to write The Amen Corner.

In 1968, Cambridge joined Robert Hooks, Douglas Turner Ward and several other actors to start the Negro Ensemble Company. He staged Ceremonies in Dark Old Men, as one of the company's first productions. This Lonne Elder III play went on to win many awards, including a Drama Desk Award for the author. Other productions Cambridge directed at NEC include Steve Carter's critically acclaimed drama, Eden.

Cambridge was a longtime resident of Los Angeles. He died as a result of injuries sustained from a fall on August 18, 2001, in New York, New York.

Selected credits

Acting

Directing

Country Cousins (1988) — Far from the Tree (1987)

Awards and nominations

Awards
 1980 Los Angeles Drama Critics Circle AwardDirection, Eden

References

External links

1920 births
2001 deaths
Accidental deaths from falls
Accidental deaths in New York (state)
American male stage actors
American male film actors
African-American male actors
People from Harlem
20th-century American male actors
20th-century African-American people